No Bears is a 2022 Iranian drama film written, directed and produced by Jafar Panahi. The film was shot secretly in Iran and stars Panahi, Vahid Mobasri, Bakhtiar Panjei and Mina Kavani. It wrapped production in May 2022 and is distributed by Celluloid Dreams. 

No Bears premiered at the 79th Venice Film Festival in competition for the Golden Lion, without the presence of the director, who has been arrested and sentenced to 6 years prison in Iran, prior to the film's release. It won the Special Jury Prize at the Venice Film Festival in September 2022, and received generally positive reviews from critics.

Premise 
The film portrays "two parallel love stories in which the lovers struggle with hidden and unavoidable obstacles, the force of superstitions and the mechanics of power".

Cast

Production 

No Bears is the ninth feature film directed by Jafar Panahi and the first one since 3 Faces (2018). This filmmaker had made two short films in between. Panahi is said to have received more freedom to produce the film after the end of the curfew imposed in 2022, due to the spread of Covid-19 in Iran.

Production wrapped in May 2022, and the rights were traded shortly after at the 2022 Cannes Film Festival by Paris-based Celluloid Dreams, which had undertaken the same task for the director's previous works.

Director's arrest 

On July 11, 2022, Panahi was arrested and sentenced to six years in Evin prison on the charges of "propaganda against the regime".

After No Bears was selected for the Golden Lion competition of the Venice Film Festival, the Ministry of Culture of the Islamic Republic of Iran called the film a "political game [rather than a] movie [that] does not have a production license". On July 28, 2022, the  issued an official statement congratulating the selected directors for the nomination, and moreover demanding from the Iranian government, to consider "the request of 19 cinema guilds, and hundreds of cinematographers [to] examine the status of these filmmakers, and their release as soon as possible".

It is reported that the 79th Venice Film Festival has been significantly affected by the arrest and trial of Panahi; Alberto Barbera, the artistic director of the said festival, after announcing the list of films in a media event, demanded the release of directors Panahi, Rasoulov and Al-Ahmad. He later called on "all filmmakers and other personalities" to join a flash mob that will take place on the red carpet before the premiere on September 9 at 16:30 at the Palazzo del Cinema, to protest Panahi's arrest and to show solidarity with others from around the world who have faced persecution in the same way.

Release 
No Bears had its world premiere in-competition at the 79th Venice International Film Festival for the Golden Lion, on 9 September 2022. Another screening of the film was scheduled for the same month at the 2022 Toronto International Film Festival.

Reception

Accolades 
Panahi competed for the Golden Lion, the main prize of the Venice Film Festival for the second time; he first received this award for his movie The Circle (2000). No Bears won the Special Jury Prize with actors Mina Kavani and Reza Heydari accepting the award in Panahi's absence.

See also
 The Year of the Everlasting Storm

References

External links 
 
 No Bears on Celluloid Dreams
 No Bears at the 79th Venice International Film Festival 
 No Bearsat the 47th Toronto International Film Festival

2020s Turkish-language films
2022 films
2022 romantic drama films
Azerbaijani-language films in Iran
Film censorship in Iran
Film controversies in Iran
Films directed by Jafar Panahi
Films set in Iran
Iranian romantic drama films
2020s Persian-language films
Venice Special Jury Prize winners
2022 multilingual films
Iranian multilingual films
